Airline bankruptcies are covered by:
 List of airline bankruptcies in the United States
 List of defunct airlines